Denmark competed at the 2020 Winter Youth Olympics in Lausanne, Switzerland from 9 to 22 January 2020.

Medalists

Alpine skiing

Girls

Cross-country skiing 

Boys

Curling

Denmark qualified a mixed team of four athletes.
Mixed team

Mixed doubles

Ice hockey

Summary

Skeleton

See also
Denmark at the 2020 Summer Olympics

References

2020 in Danish sport
Nations at the 2020 Winter Youth Olympics
Denmark at the Youth Olympics